Thredgold is a surname of early medieval English origin. Derived from the Middle English word "threden", it is an occupational nickname for an embroiderer, specifically one who embroidered fine clothes with gold thread.

Notable people with the surname include:

Chris Thredgold (born 1971), Australian footballer 
Gavin Thredgold (born 1961), Australian rowing coxswain and coach

References

Embroidery